This is a description of the concert tours that American singer-songwriter Hilary Duff has embarked on during her professional career.

Metamorphosis Tour 

The Metamorphosis Tour is the debut concert tour by the American pop singer Hilary Duff. The tour supported Duff's studio album Metamorphosis. The concert at the Ventura Theatre was filmed and released on Hilary Duff: The Concert – The Girl Can Rock.

Set list
"Girl Can Rock"
"Little Voice"
"Come Clean"
"Sweet Sixteen"
"Anywhere But Here"
"Metamorphosis"
"Where Did I Go Right"
"Love Just Is"
"The Math"
"Workin' It Out"
"Party Up"
Encore
"My Generation"
"So Yesterday"
"Why Not"

Tour dates

Notes

Most Wanted Tour

The Most Wanted Tour is the second concert tour by the American pop singer Hilary Duff. The tour supported Duff's studio album, Hilary Duff. The tour was a moderate success, practically selling out each arena prior to the show. Haylie Duff, Hilary's sister, was the opening act of the tour before the set list started.

Set list
“Girl Can Rock”
"Little Voice"
"Weird"
"Come Clean"
"Anywhere But Here"
"Metamorphosis"
"So Yesterday"
"Haters"
"Where Did I Go Right?"
"Do You Want Me?"
"Workin' it Out"
"Why Not"
"Party Up"
"Rock This World"
"Fly"
"The Getaway"
"Our Lips Are Sealed"
"My Generation"
"The Math"

Tour dates

Notes

Still Most Wanted Tour

The Still Most Wanted Tour is the third concert tour by American singer-songwriter Hilary Duff. The tour promoted her first greatest hits compilation, Most Wanted. Tour dates were canceled in Latin America. The tour was a success with the tour being sold out at over 80%.

Setlist
"Wake Up"
"The Getaway"
"Do You Want Me?"
"Underneath This Smile"
"Come Clean"
"Anywhere but Here"
"Who's That Girl?"
"Someone's Watching over Me"
"Mr. James Dean"
"Hide Away"
"Beat of My Heart"
"Cry"
"I Am"
"Party Up"
"Fly"
"Break My Heart"
"Little Voice"
"So Yesterday"
"Rock This World"

Tour dates

Dignity Tour

The Dignity Tour is the fourth concert tour by Hilary Duff in support of her fourth album Dignity. Tickets for most of the leg sold out prior to the show. The tour began in Los Angeles, California on July 28, 2007, and closed in Melbourne, Australia at Rod Laver Arena on February 3, 2008.

Concert video
Filming of the Dignity Tour took place on August 15, 2007, at Gibson Amphitheatre.  In 2010, it was released exclusively on the U.S. iTunes Store.  However, most likely due to copyright laws, the iTunes video does not include the performances of any cover songs including "Our Lips Are Sealed" and "Love Is A Battlefield".  As a result, Never Stop was also edited out of the footage because it samples "Major Tom (Coming Home)".

Setlist
"Play With Fire"
"Danger"
"Come Clean"
"The Getaway"
"Dignity"
"Gypsy Woman"
"Someone's Watching Over Me"
"Beat of My Heart"
"Our Lips Are Sealed"
"Why Not"
"So Yesterday"
"With Love"
"Never Stop" (samples "Major Tom (Coming Home)").
"Wake Up"
"I Wish"
"Love Is a Battlefield"
"Outside of You"
"Fly"
"Happy" 
"Dreamer"
"Reach Out"
"Stranger"

Tour dates

References

External links

Tours
Duff, Hillary